Sault This Week is a weekly tabloid community newspaper, established in 1967, owned by Postmedia and based in Sault Ste. Marie, Ontario. In addition to the newspaper itself, Sault This Week publishes a variety of magazines and supplements focusing on various topics: tourism, physician recruitment, post secondary students, the 50+ demographic, brides, etc.

The newspaper is delivered at no charge to the customer.

See also
List of newspapers in Canada

External links
 

Mass media in Sault Ste. Marie, Ontario
Postmedia Network publications
Weekly newspapers published in Ontario
Publications with year of establishment missing
Publications established in 1967
1967 establishments in Ontario